The black-and-gold cotinga (Lipaugus ater) is a species of bird in the family Cotingidae. It is endemic to humid Atlantic Forest in the highlands of the Serra do Mar in south-eastern Brazil. It is threatened by habitat loss, but remains common within several national parks, e.g. Serra dos Órgãos and Itatiaia. Males are highly vocal, and their loud, piercing whistle is frequently heard. It is strongly sexually dimorphic. Except for a bright yellow wing-speculum, males are superficially similar to the male common blackbird, while the far less conspicuous females are overall olive. The female resemble both sexes of the only other member of the genus, the grey-winged cotinga, but is larger, has a thicker bill, and yellowish-olive (not grey) remiges.

This species was formerly placed in the genus Tijuca. A molecular phylogenetic study published in 2014 found the Tijuca was embedded within the genus Lipaugus.  Based on this result Tijuca was subsumed into Lipaugus.

References

Further reading
 Snow, D.W. & Goodwin, D. (1974). "The Black-and-gold Cotinga." The Auk 91(2)

External links
Black-and-gold cotinga on the Internet Bird Collection
Photo; Article tropicalbirding
Black-and-gold cotinga photo gallery VIREO

Lipaugus
Birds of the Atlantic Forest
Endemic birds of Brazil
Birds described in 1829
Taxonomy articles created by Polbot